Andrew Gerhardt Droege (pronounced ) is an American actor, comedian, writer, and director best known for his online impressions of Chloë Sevigny.

Early life and education
Droege attended and graduated from Lincolnton High School in Lincolnton, North Carolina.  Droege went on to study Theatre and English at Wake Forest University in Winston-Salem, North Carolina, where he obtained a BA. Following college graduation, Droege moved to Los Angeles and started studying with The Groundlings.

Career

Television and film
Droege has appeared on television in Hot in Cleveland, Key & Peele, Bob's Burgers, How I Met Your Mother, Up All Night, New Girl, NTSF:SD:SUV::, Jon Benjamin Has a Van, Glory Daze, The Sarah Silverman Program, Kroll Show, Nick Swardson's Pretend Time, Halfway Home, Reno 911! and Campus Ladies and on film in Sassy Pants, Eating Out 4: Drama Camp and Big Gay Love.

Live performance
Droege performed in the March 2012 edition of Don't Tell My Mother, a monthly showcase event in which authors, screenwriters, actors, and comedians share true stories they would never want their mothers to know. He has directed several sketch comedy shows and Jersey Shoresical: A Frickin' Rock Opera  (winner, Best Ensemble, NY International Fringe Festival 2011 ) in Los Angeles.

Droege was a member of improvisational comedy troupe The Groundlings Sunday Company, where he currently performs and teaches. He also performs regularly at the Upright Citizens Brigade Theatre and plays a leading role in UCB's breakdancing movie musical, Freak Dance.

Web series
Droege's Chloe Sevigny impression videos have been featured on PerezHilton.com, EW.com, The Huffington Post and The New York Post, and were called "compulsively watchable" by The Advocate.

In 2012 and 2013, Droege appeared in the comedy series Romantic Encounters  and the interview series All Growz Up, both opposite Melinda Hill. Droege also starred in Crowned.

Other work
Droege's Earwolf podcast, Glitter In The Garbage, was deemed "Brilliant and Lowbrow" by New York magazine's Approval Matrix.

As a writer, Droege has contributed to OUT magazine, Logo's New Now Next Awards, E!'s Fashion Police, and Funny Or Die's Billy On The Street.

Awards
In 2010, Droege was given Outfest Film Festival's Special Programming Award For Emerging Talent.  In 2011, he was named one of Out magazine's OUT 100.  In 2012, LA Weekly cited Droege as one of Los Angeles' Top 10 Comedy Acts To Watch. In 2017, Droege won an Indie Series Award for Best Guest Actor (Comedy) for his performance as Dewey in the web series #Adulting.

Filmography

References

External links
 

Living people
American gay actors
American male television actors
American male film actors
American Internet celebrities
Gay comedians
American gay writers
American male comedians
21st-century American comedians
Upright Citizens Brigade Theater performers
Year of birth missing (living people)
21st-century LGBT people
American LGBT comedians